The 1978 UK & Ireland Greyhound Racing Year was the 52nd year of greyhound racing in the United Kingdom and Ireland.

Roll of honour

Summary
The National Greyhound Racing Club (NGRC) released the annual returns, with totalisator turnover up, at £71,504,284 and attendances down, recorded at 6,027,327 from 5688 meetings.

Lacca Champion, a brindle dog trained by Pat Mullins was voted the Greyhound of the Year after winning the 1978 English Greyhound Derby.

Paddy Keane became the first trainer to win both the English Greyhound Derby and Irish Greyhound Derby following the 1978 Irish Greyhound Derby win by Pampered Rover.

Tracks
Ramsgate owners Northern Sports bought Oxford in April, with the proviso from the council that the Stadium must be used as a recreational Stadium until 1983. The Managing Director David Hawkins changed the stadium name back to Oxford Stadium from Cowley Stadium; Bob Newson was appointed the General Manager and Jim Layton would soon arrive as Racing Manager from Catford. Northern Sports also owned Doncaster and then added independent track Long Eaton to their portfolio bringing four tracks under their banner.

Brandon Stadium in Coventry opened on 19 September. Independent track Cambridge had a second attempt at NGRC racing on 24 November; the previous attempt had only lasted five months. This second spell would be more successful with top trainers Joe Cobbold, Natalie Savva and Pat Mullins taking attachments at the track over the next couple of years.

Watford closed on 30 October; the site would now only be used by the football club. As a consequence the BAGS contract went to Willenhall.

News
The Greyhound Racing Association (GRA) made a profit which helped pay back some of their debt. The sale of the land that formerly housed Harringay Arena boosted the profits.

Trainer Phil Rees Sr. retired from training and his licence was handed to his son Phil Rees Jr. The latter chose not to take part in the trainer's championship because he had qualified by virtue of his fathers achievements in 1977. Gordon Hodson returned from Australia to take up a contract trainer's position at Brighton and two respected trainers Sid Ryall and Dave Barker retired. After a decade at Brighton, Peter Shotton took the role of head of racing at Wembley followed to the track by his assistant Jim Cremin. Other Racing Managers on the move were Jim Simpson to Romford from Crayford, Des Nichols moved to Brighton from Romford just one year after taking over from Les Cox. Paul Richardson took the chair at Brough Park and Gosforth replacing Tony Smith who switched to Crayford. At Hall Green Assistant Racing Manager Horace Peplow retired after 50 years on the racing staff and was replaced by Simon Harris son of former trainer the late Roger Harris.

John McCririck was brought in as an investigative reporter for the Sporting Life. In 1978, McCririck was voted the Specialist Writer of the Year in the British Press Awards. His stories included a sting that he had exposed based on the fact that Extel, who used to broadcast commentaries into betting shops, gave the off-times for greyhound races in minutes, without the refinement of seconds. By briefly delaying the commentaries, criminals were able to back dogs after a race had started.

During the same year McCririck took the lead in covering the Rochester Stadium coup. The track had decided to hold a dual distance event with heats over 277 metres and a final over 901 metres, unusual competitions were seen as an interesting way of presenting racing by several management teams. Two greyhounds trained by Jack Purvis both won sprint heats, Leysdown Pleasure at 33-1 and Leysdown Fun at 4–1. They had been backed off course by five South London men winning a reputed £350,000. Fun was withdrawn from the 901 metre final and Pleasure finished last, not staying the distance. BOLA advised its members to withhold payment and the Big Four Bookmakers refused to pay out. The NGRC held an inquiry and found no evidence of rule breaking. The police submitted a report to the DPP (Director of Public Prosecutions) who also took no action. It appeared that a legitimate coup had been staged and a protest resulted where 800 betting shop offices had their locks super-glued for not paying out. It was not until 1985 that a judge agreed that bookmakers were not liable to pay out.

Competitions
Greenfield Fox trained by Ted Dickson continued his fine form carried over from 1977 by claiming the Scurry Gold Cup in April from favourite Lacca Champion. Another Pat Mullins greyhound Paradise Spectre (the Grand Prix champion) won the Guys and Dolls trophy and won 18 consecutive races from 9 September 1977 to 4 February 1978.

Dickson had a superb year winning the Trainers Championship at Monmore, where he gained five winners, Donals Greatest, Rip Perry, Kudas Toy, Lesleys Charm and Black Legend.

Principal UK races

Principal Irish finals

Totalisator returns

The totalisator returns declared to the licensing authorities for the year 1978 are listed below.

References 

Greyhound racing in the United Kingdom
Greyhound racing in the Republic of Ireland
UK and Ireland Greyhound Racing Year
UK and Ireland Greyhound Racing Year
UK and Ireland Greyhound Racing Year
UK and Ireland Greyhound Racing Year